Royal Flush   is an American humor magazine founded by editor Josh Bernstein of The #Number Foundation in 1997. The magazine started as an outlet for pop artists and creative directors of other magazines. The New York City art scene has been publishing their collected works in Royal Flush for years. The magazine offers satire on many aspects of life and popular culture, rock music, and public figures.

History
Royal Flush is in its fifteenth year of publication and has a circulation of more than 40,000. Recent issues of Royal Flush have featured cover stories with Rob Zombie, Hugh M. Hefner, Danny DeVito and the cast of It’s Always Sunny in Philadelphia, Joan Jett, Patton Oswalt, My Chemical Romance and the Misfits.

Their combination of art and music is unique in articles like the one by contributor Jeff Newelt about Frank Zappa and noted comic artist Jack Kirby. The magazine is represented at the Museum of Comic and Cartoon Art festival yearly.

The magazine has gotten reviews from and has been quoted by the Los Angeles Times, USA Today, Entertainment Weekly, The New York Post, PerezHilton, AOL, Village Voice and more.

Recurring features
Royal Flush is known for many regular and semi-regular recurring features in its pages, including "Hispanic Batman" and "How Much Ya Bench?" the "music reviews", "Interviews with celebrities” and its television, movie and news story parodies.

Contributors
Royal Flush has provided an ongoing showcase for many artists with many different styles.   All the artists and writers contribute to the publication on a volunteer basis.

Writers:

 Josh Bernstein
 Steve Chanks
 Paul Cress
 Tina Benitez
 Steve Ruvolo
 Kurt Orzeck
 Jeff Newelt
 Dave Alexander
 Peter Kuper
 Seldon Hunt
 Kristin Koefoed
 Daniela Chunga
 Lawrence J Young II
 Mike Edison
 Brent Engstrom
 Patrick McQuade
 Ryan Dunlavey
 Adam Ganderson
 Larry Getlen
 Brad Angle
 Jimmy Hubbard
 G.G. Naked
 Lil’ Nubi
 Frank Powers
 Erik Rodriguez
 Ally Ruvolo
 Dan Epstein
 Harvey Pekar
 Rebecca Fain
 TJ Rosenthal
 Tim Bradstreet
 Alice Cooper
 Reyan Ali
 Anna Blumenthal
 Tim Hollingsworth
 John Reis
 David Rondinelli
 Scoop Wasserstein
 Tom Standard
 Neil Swaab
 James Wright
 Joe Puccio

Artists:

 Josh Bernstein
 Steve Chanks
 Paul Cress
 Sean Pryor
 Kristin Koefoed
 Brent Engstrom
 Patrick McQuade
 Ryan Dunlavey
 Frank Powers
 Erik Rodriguez
 Tim Bradstreet
 Danny Hellman
 Brian Ewing
 Tara McPherson
 Jesse Philips
 Stainboy
 Adam Swinbourne
 Frank Russo
 Martina Russo
 Emi Maus
 Chris Caniano
 Jim Altieri
 Pat Aulisio
 Scrojo
 Cojo
 Jason Goad
 Adam Turman
 Adam Roth
 Rob Schwager
 Jan Meininghaus
 Woodrow J. Hinton III
 Luis Diaz
 Jason Edmiston
 Gary Pullin
 Brett Marting
 Jesse Leftkowitz
 Paige Reynolds
 Derek Ballard
 Hydro 74
 Jim Mazza
 Matt Siren
 Tanxxx
 Jerry Lawler
 Derek Riggs
 Tom Standard
 Justin Erickson
 Sarah Antoinette-Martin
 Jeremy Plovony
 Robert Israel
 Jay Jay Jackson
 Jim Steranko
 Al Jaffee
 Lorenzo Mariani
 Bob Fingerman
 David Lloyd
 Jim Mahfood
 Paul Pope
 Ed Repka
 Pat Sandman
 Rick Veitch
 Robin Eley
 Drew Friedman
 Jason Dean
 Aaron Augenblick
 Peter Kuper
 K3n Adams
 Angryblue
 Florian Bertmer
 Seldon Hunt
 Bryan G. Brown
 Mitch O'Connell
 Basil Gogos
 David Kenedy
 Adam Kidder
 Jeph LaChance
 Mark McCormick
 John Pound
 JD Wilkes
 Shannon Wheeler
 Maximum Flouride
 R.Black
 James Jean
 James Wrona
 Michiko Strehenburger

Other Contributors:

 Judy Bernstein
 Jen Bernstein
 Kory Grow
 Mike Frankel
 Mara Lander
 Anna Dickson
 Anthony Scerri
 Alexis Cook
 Mike Wilson
 Patrick Albertson
 Jordan Hadley
 Eugene Wang
 Bryan Johnson
 Leni Sinclair
 Shannon Wheeler
 Justin Borucki
 Jessica Ciancanelli

Live events
Royal Flush started a series of launch events that included live performances by bands that appeared in the magazine in 2001.  The first event was on May 12, 2001, at CBGB's and featured The Spicy Rizzaks, Harvey Loves Harvey and Dar Silicon.

Royal Flush is known for their annual “Book Release” parties at the Bowery Ballroom and CBGBs in NYC. Past shows have showcased bands like Clutch, Fiend Without a Face (featuring members of Mastodon), The Giraffes, Beatallica and dozens more.

Royal Flush has teamed up with some of the biggest festivals in music - including the CMJ Fest in NYC, and the Red Gorilla Fest in Austin's SXSW Festival -for events.  Recently Royal Flush has teamed with the Rocks Off Cruises.  for a series of concerts on NYC's East River with the Black Lips, The Bouncing Souls, The Electric Six and The Detroit Cobras.

2009 saw the start of the Royal Flush Festival. The Royal Flush Festival is a showcase for the independent film, art and music scene. Initially founded in 2005 as the E. Village City Film Fest in NYC's East Village, this festival is expanding dramatically in its fifth year.

The 2009 Royal Flush Festival featured such acts as the Raincoats, Melissa Auf der Maur of Hole and The Smashing Pumpkins, beat-boxer Kenny Muhammed and several other music events in addition to 5 days of film screenings, art openings, dance parties, panel discussions and much more.

The 2010 Royal Flush Festival returned and featured such acts as Biz Markie, Black Taxi, Dungen, Kaiju Big Battel, a Rob Zombie book signing at Forbidden Planet, a Brian Ewing book signing at Brooklyn Bowl and an American Hardcore signing at the Knitting Factory.

RFMAG.com
RFMAG.com is the online home of Royal Flush, the destination for news, events, contests, exclusive comics, interviews and their own “Hot Seat” interview.

royalflushmagazine.com gives backstage exclusives, current news stories, blogs and video game reviews all at a daily pace. RFMAG.com also has original programming and exclusive videos, including celebrity cooking, to a band's tour diary to secret concerts.  There are also contests and giveaways hosted on the site.

References

External links
 

Satirical magazines published in the United States
Quarterly magazines published in the United States
Magazines established in 1997
Parodies
Magazines published in New York City